Functional near-infrared spectroscopy (fNIRS) is an optical brain monitoring technique which uses near-infrared spectroscopy for the purpose of functional neuroimaging. Using fNIRS, brain activity is measured by using near-infrared light to estimate cortical hemodynamic activity which occur in response to neural activity. Alongside EEG, fNIRS is one of the most common non-invasive neuroimaging techniques which can be used in portable contexts. The signal is often compared with the BOLD signal measured by fMRI and is capable of measuring changes both in oxy- and deoxyhemoglobin concentration, but can only measure from regions near the cortical surface. fNIRS may also be referred to as Optical Topography (OT) and is sometimes referred to simply as NIRS.

Description

fNIRS estimates the concentration of hemoglobin from changes in absorption of near infrared light. As light moves or propagates through the head, it is alternately scattered or absorbed by the tissue through which it travels. Because hemoglobin is a significant absorber of near-infrared light, changes in absorbed light can be used to reliably measure changes in hemoglobin concentration. Different fNIRS techniques can also use the way in which light propagates to estimate blood volume and oxygenation. The technique is safe, non-invasive, and can be used with other imaging modalities.

fNIRS is a non-invasive imaging method involving the quantification of chromophore concentration resolved from the measurement of near infrared (NIR) light attenuation or temporal or phasic changes. The technique takes advantage of the optical window in which (a) skin, tissue, and bone are mostly transparent to NIR light (700–900 nm spectral interval) and (b) hemoglobin (Hb) and deoxygenated-hemoglobin (deoxy-Hb) are strong absorbers of light.

There are six different ways for infrared light to interact with the brain tissue: direct transmission, diffuse transmission, specular reflection, diffuse reflection, scattering, and absorption. fNIRS focuses primarily on absorption: differences in the absorption spectra of deoxy-Hb and oxy-Hb allow the measurement of relative changes in hemoglobin concentration through the use of light attenuation at multiple wavelengths. Two or more wavelengths are selected, with one wavelength above and one below the isosbestic point of 810 nm—at which deoxy-Hb and oxy-Hb have identical absorption coefficients. Using the modified Beer-Lambert law (mBLL), relative changes in concentration can be calculated as a function of total photon path length.

Typically, the light emitter and detector are placed ipsilaterally (each emitter/detector pair on the same side) on the subject's skull so recorded measurements are due to back-scattered (reflected) light following elliptical pathways. fNIRS is most sensitive to hemodynamic changes which occur nearest to the scalp and these superficial artifacts are often addressed using additional light detectors located closer to the light source (short-separation detectors).

Modified Beer–Lambert law
Changes in light intensity can be related to changes in relative concentrations of hemoglobin through the modified Beer–Lambert law (mBLL). The Beer lambert-law has to deal with concentration of hemoglobin. This technique also measures relative changes in light attenuation as well as using mBLL to quantify hemoglobin concentration changes.

History

US & UK 
In 1977, Jöbsis reported that brain tissue transparency to NIR light allowed a non-invasive and continuous method of tissue oxygen saturation using transillumination. Transillumination (forward-scattering) was of limited utility in adults because of light attenuation and was quickly replaced by reflectance-mode based techniques - resulting in development of NIRS systems proceeding rapidly. Then, by 1985, the first studies on cerebral oxygenation were conducted by M. Ferrari. Later, in 1989, following work with David Delpy at University College London, Hamamatsu developed the first commercial NIRS system: NIR-1000 cerebral oxygenation monitor. NIRS methods were initially used for cerebral oximetry in the 1990s. In 1993, four publications by Chance et al. PNAS, Hoshi & Tamura J Appl Physiol,  Kato et al. JCBFM, Villringer et al Neuros. Lett. demonstrated the feasibility of fNIRS in adult humans. NIRS techniques were further expanded on by the work of Randall Barbour, Britton Chance, Arno Villringer, M. Cope, D. T. Delpy, Enrico Gratton, and others. Currently, wearable fNIRS are being developed.

Japan 
Meanwhile, in the mid-80's, Japanese researchers at the central research laboratory of Hitachi Ltd set out to build a NIRS-based brain monitoring system using a pulse of 70-picosecond rays. This effort came into light when the team, along with their leading expert, Dr Hideaki Koizumi (小泉 英明), held an open symposium to announce the principle of "Optical Topography" in January 1995. In fact, the term "Optical Topography" derives from the concept of using light on "2-Dimensional mapping combined with 1-Dimensional information", or topography. The idea had been successfully implemented in launching their first fNIRS (or Optical Topography, as they call it) device based on Frequency Domain in 2001: Hitachi ETG-100. Later, Harumi Oishi (大石 晴美), a PhD-to-be at Nagoya University, published her doctoral dissertation in 2003 with the subject of "language learners' cortical activation patterns measured by ETG-100" under the supervision of Professor Toru Kinoshita (木下 微)—presenting a new prospect on the use of fNIRS. The company has been advancing the ETG series ever since.

Spectroscopic techniques
Currently, there are three modalities of fNIR spectroscopy:

1. Continuous wave

2. Frequency domain

3. Time-domain

Continuous wave 
Continuous wave (CW) system uses light sources with constant frequency and amplitude. In fact, to measure absolute changes in HbO concentration with the mBLL, we need to know photon path-length. However, CW-fNIRS does not provide any knowledge of photon path-length, so changes in HbO concentration are relative to an unknown path-length. Many CW-fNIRS commercial systems use estimations of photon path-length derived from computerized Monte-Carlo simulations and physical models, to approximate absolute quantification of hemoglobin concentrations.

When the attenuation coefficients  are known, constant scattering loss is assumed, and the measurements are treated differentially in time, the equation reduces to:

Where  is the total corrected photon path-length.

Using a dual wavelength system, measurements for HbO2 and Hb can be solved from the matrix equation:

Due to their simplicity and cost-effectiveness, CW-fNIRS is by far the most common form of functional NIRS since it is the cheapest to make, applicable with more channels, and ensures a high temporal resolution. However, it does not distinguish between absorption and scattering changes, and cannot measure absolute absorption values: which means that it is only sensitive to relative change in HbO concentration.

Still, the simplicity and cost-effectiveness of CW-based devices prove themselves to be the most favorable for a number of clinical applications: neonatal care, patient monitoring systems, diffuse optical tomography, and so forth. Moreover, thanks to its portability, wireless CW systems have been developed—allowing individuals to be monitored in ambulatory, clinical and sports environments.

Frequency domain 
Frequency domain (FD) system comprises NIR laser sources which provide an amplitude-modulated sinusoid at frequencies near 100 MHz. FD-fNIRS measures attenuation, phase shift and the average path length of light through the tissue. Multi-Distance, which is a part of the FD-fNIRS, is insensitive to differences in skin color—giving constant results regardless of subject variation.

Changes in the back-scattered signal's amplitude and phase provide a direct measurement of absorption and scattering coefficients of the tissue, thus obviating the need for information about photon path-length; and from the coefficients we determine the changes in the concentration of hemodynamic parameters.

Because of the need for modulated lasers as well as phasic measurements, FD system-based devices are more technically complex (therefore more expensive and much less portable) than CW-based ones. However, the system is capable of providing absolute concentrations of HbO and HbR.

Time domain 
Time domain (TD) system introduces a short NIR pulse with a pulse length usually in the order of picoseconds—around 70 ps. Through time-of-flight measurements, photon path-length may be directly observed by dividing resolved time by the speed of light. Information about hemodynamic changes can be found in the attenuation, decay, and time profile of the back-scattered signal. For this photon-counting technology is introduced, which counts 1 photon for every 100 pulses to maintain linearity. TD-fNIRS does have a slow sampling rate as well as a limited number of wavelengths. Because of the need for a photon-counting device, high-speed detection, and high-speed emitters, time-resolved methods are the most expensive and technically complicated.

TD-based devices are totally immobile, space-consuming, the most difficult to make, costliest, hugest, and heaviest. Even so, they have the highest depth sensitivity and are capable of presenting most accurate values of baseline hemoglobin concentration and oxygenation.

Diffuse correlation spectroscopy 
Diffuse correlation spectroscopy (DCS) systems use localized gradients in light attenuation to determine absolute ratios of oxy-Hb and deoxy-Hb. Using a spatial measurement, DCS systems do not require knowledge of photon path-length to make this calculation, however measured concentrations of oxy-Hb and deoxy-Hb are relative to the unknown coefficient of scattering in the media. This technique is most commonly used in cerebral oxymetry systems that report a Tissue Oxygenation Index (TOI) or Tissue Saturation Index (TSI).

System design 
At least two open-source fNIRS models are available online:

http://www.opennirs.org
https://openfnirs.org/

Data analysis software

HOMER3 
HOMER3 allows users to obtain estimates and maps of brain activation. It is a set of matlab scripts used for analyzing fNIRS data. This set of scripts has evolved since the early 1990s first as the Photon Migration Imaging toolbox, then HOMER1 and HOMER2, and now HOMER3.

NIRS toolbox
This toolbox is a set of Matlab-based tools for the analysis of functional near-infrared spectroscopy (fNIRS). This toolbox defines the +nirs namespace and includes a series of tools for signal processing, display, and statistics of fNIRS data. This toolbox is built around an object-oriented framework of Matlab classes and namespaces.

AtlasViewer 
AtlasViewer allows fNIRS data to be visualized on a model of the brain. In addition, it also allows the user to design probes which can eventually be placed onto a subject.

Application

Brain–computer interface 
fNIRS has been successfully implemented as a control signal for brain–computer interface systems.

Hypoxia & altitude studies 

With our constant need for oxygen, our body has developed multiple mechanisms that detect oxygen levels, which in turn can activate appropriate responses to counter hypoxia and generate a higher oxygen supply. Moreover, understanding the physiological mechanism underlying the bodily response to oxygen deprivation is of major importance and NIRS devices have shown to be a great tool in this field of research.

Brain mapping

Functional connectivity 

fNIRS measurements can be used to calculate functional connectivity. Multi-channel fNIRS measurements create a topographical map of neural activation, whereby temporal correlation between spatially separated events can be analyzed. Functional connectivity is typically assessed in terms correlations between the hemodynamic responses of spatially distinct regions of interest (ROIs). In brain studies, functional connectivity measurements are commonly taken for resting state patient data, as well as data recorded over stimulus paradigms. The low cost, portability and high temporal resolution of fNIRS, with respect to fMRI, have proven to be highly advantageous in studies of this nature.

Cerebral oximetry 
NIRS monitoring is helpful in a number of ways. Preterm infants can be monitored reducing cerebral hypoxia and hyperoxia with different patterns of activities. It is an effective aid in Cardiopulmonary bypass, is strongly considered to improve patient outcomes and reduce costs and extended stays.

There are inconclusive results for use of NIRS with patients with traumatic brain injury, so it has been concluded that it should remain a research tool.

Diffuse optical tomography 
Diffuse optical tomography is the 3D version of Diffuse optical imaging. Diffuse optical images are obtained using NIRS or fluorescence-based methods. These images can be used to develop a 3D volumetric model which is known as the Diffuse Optical Tomography.

fNIRS cap 
fNIRS electrode locations can be defined using a variety of layouts, including names and locations that are specified by the International 10–20 system as well as other layouts that are specifically optimized to maintain a consistent 30mm distance between each location. In addition to the standard positions of electrodes, short separation channels can be added. Short separation channels allow the measurement of scalp signals. Since the short separation channels measure the signal coming from the scalp, they allow the removal of the signal of superficial layers. This leaves behind the actual brain response. Short separation channel detectors are usually placed 8mm away from a source. They do not need to be in a specific direction or in the same direction as a detector.

Functional neuroimaging
The use of fNIRS as a functional neuroimaging method relies on the principle of neuro-vascular coupling also known as the haemodynamic response or blood-oxygen-level dependent (BOLD) response. This principle also forms the core of fMRI techniques. Through neuro-vascular coupling, neuronal activity is linked to related changes in localized cerebral blood flow. fNIRS and fMRI are sensitive to similar physiologic changes and are often comparative methods. Studies relating fMRI and fNIRS show highly correlated results in cognitive tasks. fNIRS has several advantages in cost and portability over fMRI, but cannot be used to measure cortical activity more than 4 cm deep due to limitations in light emitter power and has more limited spatial resolution. fNIRS includes the use of diffuse optical tomography (DOT/NIRDOT) for functional purposes. Multiplexing fNIRS channels can allow 2D topographic functional maps of brain activity (e.g. with Hitachi ETG-4000, Artinis Oxymon, NIRx NIRScout, etc.) while using multiple emitter spacings may be used to build 3D tomographic maps.

Hyperscanning 

Hyperscanning involves two or more brains monitored simultaneously to investigate interpersonal (across-brains) neural correlates in various social situations, which proves fNIRS to be a suitable modality for investigating live brain-to-brain social interactions.

Virtual and augmented reality 

Modern fNIRS systems are combined with virtual or augmented reality in studies on brain-computer interfaces, neurorehabilitation or social perception.

Music and the brain 
fNIRS can be used to monitor musicians' brain activity while playing musical instruments.

Pros and cons 
The advantages of fNIRS are, among other things: noninvasiveness, low-cost modalities, perfect safety, high temporal resolution, full compatibility with other imaging modalities, and multiple hemodynamic biomarkers.

However, no system is without limitations. For fNIRS those include: low brain sensitivity, low spatial resolution, and shallow penetration depth.

Future directions 
Despite a few limitations, fNIRS devices are relatively small, lightweight, portable and wearable. Thanks to these features, applications for the devices are astounding—which make them easily accessible in many different scenarios. For example, they have the potential to be used in clinics, a global health situation, a natural environment, and as a health tracker.

Ultimately, future at-risk individuals in hospitals could benefit from neuromonitoring and neurorehabilitation that fNIRS can offer.

Now there are fully wireless research grade fNIRS systems in the market.

fNIRS compared with other neuroimaging techniques 

Comparing and contrasting other neuroimaging devices is an important thing to take into consideration. When comparing and contrasting these devices it is important to look at the temporal resolution, spatial resolution, and the degree of immobility. EEG (electroencephalograph) and MEG (magnetoencephalography) have high temporal resolution, but a low spatial resolution. EEG also has a higher degree of mobility than MEG has. When looking at fNIRS, they are similar to an EEG. They have a high degree of mobility as well as temporal resolution, and they have low spatial resolution. PET scans and fMRIs are grouped together, however they are distinctly different from the other neuroimaging scans. They have a high degree of immobility, medium/high spatial resolution, and a low temporal resolution. All of these neuroimaging scans have important characteristics and are valuable, however they have distinct characteristics.

Among all other facts, what makes fNIRS a special point of interest is that it is compatible with some of these modalities, including: MRI, EEG, and MEG.

See also 
Near-infrared spectroscopy
Diffuse optical tomography
Functional neuroimaging
Cognitive neuroscience
The Society for Functional Near Infrared Society (external link)
Global fNIRS (external Link)
An example of a mobile fNIRS system designed for studies in VR environments
Soterix Medical fNIRS
Cortech Solutions fNIRS
Neural synchrony

References

Neuroimaging
Optical imaging